The women's 4 x 100 metres relay at the 1998 European Athletics Championships was held at the Népstadion on 22 August.

Medalists

Results

Heats
Qualification: First 3 in each heat (Q) and the next 2 fastest (q) advance to the Final.

Final

References

Results
Results
Results

Relay
Relays at the European Athletics Championships
1998 in women's athletics